Mary Wills (July 4, 1914 – February 7, 1997) was an American costume designer.

Wills was born in Prescott, Arizona.  In the 1930s, her family moved to Albuquerque, New Mexico.

Willis studied at the University of Arizona before completing her bachelor's degree at the University of New Mexico.  She began her career creating sets and costumes at the University of New Mexico in Albuquerque.  She went on to earn a master's degree at the Yale University Art and Drama School.

Her first job in Hollywood was working as a sketch artist on Gone with the Wind.

She was nominated for an Oscar seven times, earning the Academy Award for her colorful designs for The Wonderful World of the Brothers Grimm in 1962. In addition to designing for film, she has also worked on live shows, including Shipstead & Johnson's Ice Follies and the New Buffalo Bill Wild West Show.

Wills died in Sedona, Arizona, at age 82 of renal failure.  Her original sketches are part of the collection at Los Angeles County Museum of Art.

References

1914 births
1997 deaths
Best Costume Design Academy Award winners
Deaths from kidney failure
American costume designers
Women costume designers